Nigel Kitching (born 29 May 1959) is a British comic book writer and artist.

He is best known for his work in British comics, especially Sonic the Comic, the premiere UK depiction of Sonic the Hedgehog.

Since 2001, Kitching has lectured at Teesside University.

References

 
 
2000 AD profile

External links
Official web site
Nigel Kitching's article on his Sonic the Comic run
Profile at Bullet Proof Comics

Interviews
Interview at 2000AD Review

British comics artists
British comics writers
Academics of Teesside University
1959 births
Living people